Last Chance to Dance Trance (Perhaps): Best Of (1991–1996) is a greatest hits compilation released by Medeski Martin & Wood.

Track listing
"Chubb Subb" (new mix) – 5:21
"Bubblehouse" – 4:28
"Last Chance to Dance Trance (Perhaps)" – 7:38
"Hermeto's Daydream" – 7:11
"Is There Anybody Here That Love My Jesus" – 4:26
"The Lover" (new mix) – 6:47
"Where's Sly" (new mix) – 5:34
"Macha" – 3:19
"Beeah" – 6:56
"Strance of the Spirit Red Gator" – 5:54
"Bemsha Swing/Lively Up Yourself" – 5:39
"Dracula" – 4:17
"Night Marchers" (live April 18, 1996 in Boulder, Colorado) – 7:36

Personnel
John Medeski – keyboards
Billy Martin – drums, percussion
Chris Wood – acoustic bass
Scotty Hard at Greene Street Recordings – new mixes of "Where's Sly?", "The Lover", and "Chubb Sub"
Mark Wilder at Sony Music Studios, NYC – mastering
Mike King, David Greenberg – production assistance
illyB – art
Hadley Stern – design

References

1999 greatest hits albums
Gramavision Records compilation albums
Medeski Martin & Wood compilation albums